Santiago Álvarez Gómez (1913–2002) was a Spanish communist and founder of the Communist Party of Galicia. He had been a member of the Communist Party of Spain (PCE) and one of the commissars of the 1st Mixed Brigade of the Spanish Republican Army in the Spanish Civil War.

References

Spanish Marxists
Communist Party of Spain politicians
Spanish communists
1913 births
2002 deaths